Odetta in Japan is a live album by American folk singer Odetta, released in 1966. It was her final album for RCA Victor.

The song "Sakura" went on to become an iconic hip-hop sample of the 1990s, as featured in East Flatbush Project's "Tried By 12".

Track listing
All tracks arranged by Odetta; except where indicated
"If I Had a Hammer" (Lee Hays, Pete Seeger) – 1:58	 
"Kaeshite Okure Ima Suguni" (Taku Izumi, Toshio Fujita) – 4:43	 
"The Fox" – 2:00	 
"Chilly Winds" – 3:59	 
"Ain't No More Cane on This Brazos" – 3:40	 
"One Man's Hand" (Alex Comfort, Pete Seeger) – 3:10	 
"On Top of Old Smokey" (Traditional) – 3:40	 
"Sakura" – 2:22	 
"Hush Little Baby" – 1:21	 
"Why Oh Why" (Woody Guthrie) – 3:10	 
"Joshua Fought The Battle of Jericho" – 2:10	 
"We Shall Overcome" (Frank Hamilton, Guy Carawan, Pete Seeger, Zilphia Horton) – 5:23

Personnel
Odetta – vocals, guitar
Bruce Langhorne – guitar
Les Grinage (aka Raphael Grinage) – bass

Odetta live albums
1966 live albums
RCA Records live albums